Georgia E. Lee Patton Washington (April 16, 1864 – November 8, 1900) was an American missionary and physician. Following her education, she served as a medical missionary in Liberia. She was the first black woman to become a licensed surgeon and physician in Tennessee.

Biography 
Georgia was born on April 15, 1864 into a family of slaves of the South of the United States. She had a twin sister who did not survive the complications of birth

Although she was born in Grundy County, Tennessee, her mother decided to move to Coffee County, an adjoining county that would be home to the youngest of the family for years to come.

Georgia's father died shortly before she came into the world, leaving her mother as the caretaker of the whole family. Like the vast majority of slaves at the time, Georgia's mother was sent away from her task-maker who had grown rich from others toil, with nothing, forcing her to suffer from severe poverty. However, by diligence and working early in the morning and late at night, she managed to provide for all of her children and send them to the few months of school that were occasionally taught. Although Georgia was able to attend school, at the age of seventeen she had only gone for a total of twenty-six months, a little more than two years. Her clothing consisted of scanty underwear and a cotton dress, all handmade by her mother

Being the youngest of the family, Georgia was often treated with favoritism and her mother would not allow her to engage in washing and spinning as her older sisters did. On the other hand, and because of her love for nature, she started learning the plowing trade from a very early age

Early life and education
At the age of sixteen, Georgia's mother died, leaving her alone and forcing her to move to the home of one of her older sisters. After the death of her mother, Georgia started to look for ways to become an educated woman

A year after, she found what she thought to be the perfect path to achieve college education, working as a maid for a family. Unfortunately, Georgia did not have the support of her older sister and soon after, she was forced to return to public school and the knowledge gained there only sharpened her aspiration for something higher

One day, after her sister have her five dollars, she collected her most precious possessions and run to Nashville and although after purchasing the ticket, she was left with less than two dollars, she believed that having God on her side, would help her to overcome any inconvenience. At the station, she met with her long-lost brother who was married and lived in Nashville, and went to his house. Her older sisters sent her eight dollars with which she was able to pay for the tuition and the necessary books for the months left of college

Though her brother's house was more than two miles away and the weather conditions were not always in her favour, she managed to be always the most punctual in the class. She was often made fun of for her mistakes and awkward manners but that did not stop her from achieve her dream of becoming a college educated woman

After the school year had come to an end, she went to Kentucky and secured her place at a small school. This enabled her to attend college for a few months, in the following months, she had completed her senior course. After graduating from a literature course, she decided, unsatisfied with her usefulness, to start a medical course at the Central Tennessee College's Meharry Medical Department, becoming, a few years later in 1893, the first black woman to graduate as a licensed surgeon and physician in Tennessee

Medical missionary
Patton was deeply attached to religion and was part of the Methodist Episcopal Church. Although she did not officially have the support of the church and had to bear the expenses of the trip, she decided to travel to Liberia, Africa, as a medical missionary

After Patton arrived to Liberia, on April 5, 1893, another African-American missionary started to draw attention to the lack of professional health care in the country. Medicine such as quinine was already available, but there were no emergency doctors. Georgia was known for treating an indigenous community, where she advised tonics for different illnesses such as fever, enlarged spleens or abdominal congestions. During her time there, she identified anaemia and dropsy as chronic ailments that mainly affected the Kru, the dominant ethnic group in Monrovia, also known as the Kroom

In her trip, Patton recognised the value of learning about native treatments to face the infections and illnesses that plagued the vast majority of her patients. In the search for a cure and an effective treatment for the Guinea Worm, Patton developed the methods of "strapping" and "shafting", offering directions to other medical professionals about said techniques

Later years
After her two-year long experience in Liberia as a medical missionary, Patton returned to the United States in order to continue her education with a post-graduate course in medicine. During her return trip, she was infected with a pretty common illness of the time, tuberculosis, and never fully regained her previous health. She settled in Memphis and started a private medical practice becoming the first black female doctor in Tennessee

On December 29, 1897, she married letter carrier David W. Washington and two years later, in 1899, they had their first son, Willie Patton Washington, who died days after his birth. The couple had met through their active volunteering in their church and community. Patton was a very respected member in her community, for her monthly ten-dollar donation to the Freedmen's Aid Society and was often called "Gold Lady" due to her generosity.

In the last few years of her life, Patton worked sporadically due to her poor health. She died on November 8, 1900, in the city of Memphis, four months after giving birth to her second child, David W. Washington Jr, who died soon after his mother.

Notes

References
 Patton, Georgia E. L. "Brief Autobiography of a Colored Woman Who Has Recently Emigrated to Liberia," Liberia 3 (November 1893)

Further reading
Derr, Mary Krane. "Georgia E.L. Patton," in African American National Biography: Volume Six, ed. Henry Louis Gates, Jr. and Evelyn Brooks-Higginbotham (New York: Oxford University Press, 2008)

Wells, Ida B. Crusade for Justice: The Autobiography of Ida B. Wells, ed. Alfreda M. Duster (Chicago: University of Chicago Press, 1970.)

1864 births
1900 deaths
19th-century American physicians
African-American missionaries
American expatriates in Liberia
American Methodist missionaries
19th-century American slaves
American surgeons
Christian medical missionaries
Female Christian missionaries
Methodist missionaries in Liberia
People from Grundy County, Tennessee
19th-century American women physicians
African-American women physicians
African-American physicians
Women surgeons
19th-century surgeons
19th-century deaths from tuberculosis
Tuberculosis deaths in the United States